The Côte Aftissate-Boujdour is a Ramsar Site that stretches along  of the Western Sahara coast south of Boujdour.
It includes the fishing village of Aftissat.

Location

The Côte Aftissate-Boujdour is located in Jraifia commune, Boujdour Province in the Laâyoune-Sakia El Hamra region. The site was designated on 16 April 2019.

Ecology

The Côte Aftissate-Boujdour is at the southern edge of the Palearctic ecozone.
The climate is strongly influenced by coastal upwelling.
The wetland is a resting area for Palearctic seabirds, waders and land migrants, and for passerines in particular.
Over 1% of the biogeographic population of species such as the lesser black-backed gull (Larus fuscus) are found in the wetland in winter.
The dry area is home to the endemic gecko Saurodactylus brosseti and other rare and endemic species.

Notes

Sources

Ramsar sites in Morocco